Amar Shah (born 12 October 1985) is a Kenyan former swimmer who specialized in breaststroke, but also competed in the freestyle relays. He is a single-time Olympian (2004), and a two-time swimmer at the Commonwealth Games (2006, and 2010). Shah qualified for the semifinals in 2010 Commonwealth Games setting a national record in the 50m breaststroke in a time of 30.53. He currently holds three long-course Kenyan records in the 50, 100 and 200 m breaststroke. Shah also won a total of bronze medals, as a member of the Kenyan swimming team, in the freestyle and medley relays (along with brothers David and Jason Dunford) at the 2011 All-Africa Games in Maputo, Mozambique.

Shah qualified for the men's 100 m breaststroke at the 2004 Summer Olympics in Athens, by receiving a Universality place from FINA in an entry time of 1:11.01. He participated in heat one against three other swimmers Eric Williams of Nigeria, Chisela Kanchela of Zambia, and Alice Shrestha of Nepal. He set a Kenyan record of 1:10.17 to earn a third spot by a 2.48-second margin behind winner Williams. Shah failed to advance into the semifinals, as he placed fifty-eighth overall out of 60 swimmers on the first day of preliminaries.

References

External links
 

1985 births
Living people
Kenyan male swimmers
Olympic swimmers of Kenya
Swimmers at the 2004 Summer Olympics
Swimmers at the 2006 Commonwealth Games
Swimmers at the 2010 Commonwealth Games
Commonwealth Games competitors for Kenya
Male breaststroke swimmers
African Games bronze medalists for Kenya
African Games medalists in swimming
Competitors at the 2011 All-Africa Games
Kenyan people of Indian descent
Alumni of the University of Nottingham
People educated at Millfield